Modern Norwegian is the Norwegian language that emerged after the Middle Norwegian transition period (1350–1536) and Dano-Norwegian. The transition to Modern Norwegian is usually dated to 1525, or 1536, the year of the Protestant Reformation and the beginning of the kingdoms of Denmark–Norway (1537–1814).

In contrast to Old Norse, Modern Norwegian has simplified inflections and a more fixed syntax.  Old Norse vocabulary is to a considerable degree substituted by Low German, and this is the main reason why Modern Norwegian, together with contemporary Norwegian in general, Danish and Swedish, is no longer mutually intelligible with Insular Nordic (Icelandic and Faroese), except from some Nynorsk/Høgnorsk and dialect users to a lesser extent.

While Modern Norwegian is a linguistic term with a specific historical meaning, contemporary Norwegian also includes the Dano-Norwegian koiné dialect from Oslo, that evolved into Standard Østnorsk (Standard East Norwegian) and the related official written standard Bokmål. Standard Østnorsk is spoken by a large and rapidly growing minority of Norwegians in East Norway, and Bokmål is by far the most widely used written language, even among users of Modern Norwegian dialects.

In contrast to Nynorsk
The Norwegian linguistic term for Modern Norwegian is nynorsk, literally New Norwegian. Nynorsk is also the name of a Norwegian written standard based on Modern Norwegian dialects, as opposed to Bokmål.

The terms Nynorsk, Modern Norwegian and Contemporary Norwegian are somewhat confusing, because in Norwegian the same term Nynorsk is used for the first two, while Contemporary Norwegian could easily be called moderne norsk (literally Modern Norwegian) in Norwegian.

See also

Language history
Old Norse language
Old Norwegian
Middle Norwegian
Dano-Norwegian
Norwegian language

Orthographies
Dano-Norwegian origin
Bokmål: official written language, based on Dano-Norwegian, but with significant changes. Also known as bogmaal and bogsprog until 1899, when the term riksmål was adopted. Bokmål was re-adopted as the official name in 1929.
Riksmål: unofficial, based on Dano-Norwegian, and pre-1938 Bokmål, but with some modernisation since. It is standardised by Norwegian Academy for Language and Literature. It was also the official name of Bokmål from its introduction in 1899 until the Storting decided to revert to Bokmål in 1929.
Norwegian origin
Høgnorsk: unofficial, based on the original Landsmål and pre-1938 Nynorsk. It has no standardising body, but is promoted by Ivar Aasen-sambandet, which hosts a wiki called Mållekken.
Landsmål: the official name of Nynorsk until 1929, sometimes strictly referring to the original orthography developed by Ivar Aasen.
Nynorsk: official written language, primary based on the West Norwegian Dialects. It has gone through several reforms and differs significantly from its original form.

Norwegian language